Al-Thawrah District is a district of the Raqqa Governorate in northern Syria. The administrative centre is the city of al-Thawrah. At the 2004 census, the district had a population of 159,840.

Sub-districts
The district of al-Thawrah is divided into three subdistricts or nawāḥī (population as of 2004):
Al-Thawrah Subdistrict (ناحية الثورة): population 69,425.
Al-Mansurah Subdistrict (ناحية المنصورة): population 58,727
Al-Jarniyah Subdistrict (ناحية الجرنية): population 31,786.

References

 
Districts of Raqqa Governorate